The Return of Sarah's Daughters is a 1997 documentary film exploring the lives of three American Jewish women and their relationships with Judaism. The documentary was directed by filmmaker Marcia Jarmel and was aired on PBS. The film explores the autobiographical account of a Jewish feminist and her decision to join the Chabad Hasidic community.

See also 
 Chabad in film and television
 Kosher Love
 Shekinah Rising

References 

Films about Orthodox and Hasidic Jews
Films about Chabad
1997 films
1997 documentary films
American documentary films
Jewish feminism
1990s American films